Nahanni: River of Forgiveness is a Canadian documentary film, directed by Geoff Bowie and released in 2019. The film centres on a 2018 project by twelve Dene people from the Northwest Territories to recreate a traditional expedition on the Nahanni River in a mooseskin canoe.

The film premiered at the 2019 Yellowknife International Film Festival, before being broadcast on the Documentary Channel in 2020.

Kiarash Sadigh received a Canadian Screen Award nomination for Best Cinematography in a Documentary at the 9th Canadian Screen Awards in 2021.

References

External links
 

2019 films
2019 documentary films
Canadian documentary films
Documentary films about First Nations
Films shot in the Northwest Territories
2010s English-language films
2010s Canadian films